Single Cell Orchestra is the self-titled second album of Single Cell Orchestra released in 1996.

Track listing
 "A Better Place"  – 7:08
 "Start"  – 5:44
 "Letters From Nowhere"  – 5:08
 "Knockout Drops (200 Proof Mix)"  – 8:15
 "Divinity"  – 5:20
 "Kudowbuz"  – 5:30
 "The Slenderest of Threads"  – 7:01
 "Transmit Liberation"  – 9:45
 "Flight 2127"  – 10:17
 "Freefall"  – 4:21

References

1996 albums
Single Cell Orchestra albums